The Philippine Academy of the Spanish Language (abbreviated AFLE) is the language regulator for the Spanish language in the Philippines. It is one of two Spanish language regulators located in countries where the language does not have an official status nationwide, the other being the North American Academy of the Spanish Language in the United States.

A founding member of the Asociación de Academias de la Lengua Española (ASALE), the academy was formerly headquartered in the Casino Español de Manila in Ermita, Manila before moving to its current headquarters in Makati.

History

The Philippine Academy of the Spanish Language was established in Manila on July 25, 1924. The eleventh Spanish language academy in the world to be founded, its establishment reflected the preeminent position of Spanish as a language in the Philippines at the time despite already-existing cultural influences coming from the United States.

Despite the diminishing position of Spanish in the Philippines relative to English, the academy continued to exist despite intermittent criticism. In 1986, Spanish poet Dámaso Alonso unsuccessfully called for its dissolution, citing Enrique Fernández Lumba, a member who had dismissed the organization as a "relic".

In 2008, El País reported that the Securities and Exchange Commission revoked the academy's corporate registration in 2003 due to its non-filing of annual returns. Despite this, the academy nonetheless is recognized as possibly playing a key role again in revitalizing the Spanish language and promoting Spanish culture in the Philippines, a role that it also played in previous years.

Darío Villanueva, director of the Real Academia Española (RAE), visited the Philippine Academy of the Spanish Language in July 2017 as part of his official visit to the Philippines. During his visit, where he also presided over a meeting of the academy's board of directors, he remarked that the academy served as "the perennial lighthouse of the Spanish language" in the country.

Status of Spanish in the Philippines

Section 7, Article XIV of the present 1987 Philippine Constitution specifies Spanish (along with Arabic) as a language to "be promoted on a voluntary and optional basis".

Spanish was the language of government, education and trade throughout the three centuries (333 years) of the Philippines being part of the Spanish Empire and continued to serve as a lingua franca until the first half of the 20th century.

In December 2007, former President Gloria Macapagal Arroyo signed a directive in Spain requiring the teaching and learning of the Spanish language in the Philippine school system starting in 2008. The Under-Secretary of the Department of Education, Vilma L. Labrador, circulated a Memorandum (17/XII/2007), on the "Restoration of the Spanish language in Philippine Education". In it, the department mandates secondary schools to offer basic and advanced Spanish.

Projects
In the 2021 edition of the Crónica de la lengua española, published by the RAE, the Philippine Academy of the Spanish Language announced that it had finished work on a Spanish–Chavacano dictionary, with the financial backing of ASALE. It also stated that it was working on compiling research materials for a commemorative book to celebrate the academy's centennial in 2024,  and that it had restarted publication of its newsletter, the Boletín de la Academia Filipina de la Lengua Española (BAFLE), in October 2021.

Administration

Directors
The Philippine Academy of the Spanish Language is led by a Board of Directors (Junta Directiva), which includes a director, two honorary directors, a vice-director, a secretary, a treasurer, a coordinator and the organization's librarian. Since August 22, 2016, the academy has been led by the Recollect priest Emmanuel Luis Romanillos.

Romanillos, a historian who became an academic of the academy in 2005 and who previously served as its coordinator prior to becoming director, is associate professor of Spanish, Italian and Latin at the University of the Philippines Diliman, where he has taught for 30 years.

Academics in order of seniority
Among the academics of the Philippine Academy, both former and current, are prominent political figures like former president Arroyo and former foreign affairs secretary Alberto Romulo, religious figures such as Emeritus Archbishop of Cebú Cardinal Ricardo Vidal, cultural figures like Francisco Alonso Liongson, and academics like Guillermo Gómez Rivera and Miguel Bernad.

While all of the Academy's academics are Spanish speakers, Guillermo Gómez Rivera is the only Filipino member who speaks Spanish as his native language; all of the Academy's other Filipino academics speak Spanish as a second language.

 Guillermo Gómez Rivera
 Edmundo Farolán
 Ramón A. Pedrosa
 José Rodríguez Rodríguez
 Diosdado Talamayan y Aenlle, D.D.
 Rosalinda Orosa
 José Arcilla, SJ
 María Consuelo Puyat-Reyes
 Francisco C. Delgado

 Gloria Macapagal Arroyo
 Salvador B. Malig
 Alberto G. Rómulo
 Wystan de la Peña Salarda
 Lourdes Castrillo de Brillantes
 Emmanuel Luis A. Romanillos, OAR
 José María Cariño y Ancheta
 Macario Ofilada Mina
 Erwin Thaddeus Bautista Luna

 René Ángelo Prado Singian
 René S. Salvania
 Trinidad O. Regala
 Daisy López
 Geraldine Román Batista
 Charlene Pangilinan-Manese (elected)
 Georgina Padilla Zóbel
 Gaspar A. Vibal

See also
 Association of Spanish Language Academies
 Latin Union
 Philippine literature in Spanish
 Spanish language in the Philippines
 Spanish Filipino

References

External links
 
 

Spanish language academies
Educational organizations based in the Philippines
Philippines–Spain relations
Organizations established in 1924
1924 establishments in the Philippines
Spanish language in the Philippines